Queen of the Mask upcoming South Korean television series starring Kim Sun-a, Oh Yoon-ah, Shin Eun-jung, and Yoo Sun. It is scheduled to premiere on Channel A in April, 2023. and will air every Monday and Tuesday.

Synopsis 
Four friends were involved in a murder, the three turned their backs on the fourth by pinning the accusation on her. Which prompted her to flee to the United States. Now, ten years later, that fourth friend has returned and plans to uncover the truth.

Cast 
 Kim Sun-a as Do Jae-yi
 Oh Yoon-ah as Go Yoo-na
 Shin Eun-jung as Joo Yoo-jung
 Yoo Sun as Yoon Hae-mi
 Oh Ji-ho as Choi Kang-hoo
 Lee Jung-jin as Song Je-hyeok 
 Shin Ji-hoon as Leo

References

External links 
  
 

Korean-language television shows
Channel A television dramas
Television series about revenge
South Korean mystery television series
Television series by RaemongRaein
2023 South Korean television series debuts

Upcoming television series